Macrohastina azela is a moth in the family Geometridae first described by Arthur Gardiner Butler in 1878. It is found in Japan.

The wingspan is 18–21 mm.

References

Moths described in 1878
Asthenini
Moths of Japan